Sjaak Lettinga (born 16 September 1982 in Amsterdam) is a Dutch professional footballer who plays as a midfielder. He is currently without a club after having formerly played for FC Volendam, Helmond Sport and Telstar.

External links
 Voetbal International profile 

1982 births
Living people
Dutch footballers
FC Volendam players
Helmond Sport players
SC Telstar players
Eerste Divisie players
Footballers from Amsterdam
Association football midfielders